London 3 South West is an English rugby union league at the eighth level of club rugby union in England involving sides based in Hampshire, Surrey and south-west London.  Promoted clubs move into London 2 South West.  Relegated clubs move into either Surrey 1 or Hampshire Premier depending on their location, with sides coming up from these divisions, although only 1st XV clubs are allowed in London 3 South West.  Each year all clubs in the division also take part in the RFU Senior Vase - a level 8 national competition.

Teams for 2021–22

The teams competing in 2021-22 achieved their places in the league based on performances in 2019-20, the 'previous season' column in the table below refers to that season not 2020-21.

Season 2020–21

On 30th October the RFU announced  that a decision had been taken to cancel Adult Competitive Leagues (National League 1 and below) for the 2020/21 season meaning London 3 South West was not contested.

Teams for 2019–20

United Services Portsmouth who finished 5th in 2018-19 were unable to fulfil their fixtures in and withdrew from the league in November 2019.

Teams for 2018–19

Teams for 2017–18

Participating Clubs 2016-17
Battersea Ironsides 
Basingstoke (relegated from London 2 South West)
Bognor (promoted from Hampshire 1)
Eastleigh
Farnham
Milbrook (promoted from Hampshire 1)
Old Cranleighans (promoted from Surrey 1)
Old Tiffinians 
Teddington
Trojans
United Services Portsmouth
Weybridge Vandals (relegated from London 2 South West)

Participating Clubs 2015-16
Battersea Ironsides (promoted from Surrey 1)
Camberley (promoted from Surrey 1)
Eastleigh
Farnham (relegated from London 2 South West)
New Milton & District
Old Tiffinians 
Old Mid-Whitgiftian
Old Tonbridgians 
Purley John Fisher
Teddington
Trojans
 United Services Portsmouth (promoted from Hampshire 1 (winners))

Participating Clubs 2014-15
Andover (promoted from Hampshire 1)
Eastleigh
Ellingham & Ringwood
London Exiles
New Milton & District
Old Tiffinians (promoted from Surrey 1)
Old Mid-Whitgiftian
Old Tonbridgians (promoted from Surrey 1)
Purley John Fisher
Sandown & Shanklin
Teddington (relegated from London 2 South West)
Trojans (relegated from London 2 South West)

Participating Clubs 2013-14
Camberley (relegated from London 2 South West)
Eastleigh
Ellingham & Ringwood
Farnham (promoted from Surrey 1 (winners))
KCS Old Boys (relegated from London 2 South West)
London Exiles
New Milton & District (promoted from Hampshire 1 (winners))
Old Cranleighans (promoted from Surrey 1 (play-off winners)
Old Mid-Whitgiftian
Old Wellingtonian
Purley John Fisher
Sandown & Shanklin

Participating Clubs 2012-13
Bognor (relegated from London 2 South West)
Eastleigh (promoted from Hampshire 1 (winners))
Ellingham & Ringwood
London Exiles (promoted from Surrey 1 (winners))
Old Blues
Old Mid-Whitgiftian (relegated from London 2 South East)
Old Paulines (promoted from Surrey 1 (play-off winners))
Old Wellingtonians
Purley John Fisher
Sandown & Shanklin
Weybridge Vandals
Winchester

Participating Clubs 2011-12
Alton
Andover (promoted from Hampshire 1 (winners)
Ellingham & Ringwood
KCS Old Boys (relegated from London 2 South West)
Old Alleynian
Old Blues (promoted from Surrey 1 (play-off winners))
Old Freemans (promoted from Surrey 1 (winners))
Old Wellingtonians
Purley John Fisher (relegated from London 2 South East)
Sandown & Shanklin
Weybridge Vandals (relegated from London 2 South West)
Winchester

Participating Clubs 2010-11
Alton (Promoted from Hampshire 1 (winners))
Camberley
Ellingham & Ringwood
Fordingbridge
London South Africa (relegated from London 2 South West)
Old Alleynian
Old Wellingtonians
Old Wimbledonians
Petersfield (Promoted from Hampshire 1 (play-off winners))
Sandown & Shanklin
Teddington (Promoted from Surrey 1 (winners))
Winchester (relegated from London 2 South West)

Participating Clubs 2009-10
Andover
Camberley
Ellingham & Ringwood
Fordingbridge (promoted from Hampshire 1 (winners))
Gosport & Fareham
Kingston
Old Alleynian
Old Mid-Whitgiftian
Old Paulines (promoted from Surrey 1 (winners)
Old Wellingtonians
Old Wimbledonians
Sandown & Shanklin (promoted from Hampshire 1 (play-off winners))

Original teams
When this division was introduced in 2000 (as London 4 South West) it contained the following teams:

Barnes - relegated from London 3 South West (8th)
Chobham - promoted from Surrey 1 (champions)
Cobham - relegated from London 3 South West (7th)
Cranleigh - relegated from London 3 South West (9th)
Fawley - relegated from London 3 South West (14th)
Old Alleynians - relegated from London 3 South West (15th)
Purley John Fisher - relegated from London 3 South West (13th)
Reeds Weybridge - relegated from London 3 South West (10th)
Southampton - relegated from London 3 South West (11th)
Tottonians - relegated from London 3 South West (12th)
United Services Portsmouth - promoted from Hampshire 1 (champions)

London 3 South West honours

London 4 South West (2000–2009)

Originally known as London 4 South West, this division was a tier 8 league with promotion up to London 3 South West and relegation down to either Hampshire 1 or Surrey 1.

London 3 South West (2009–present)

League restructuring by the RFU ahead of the 2009–10 season saw London 4 South West renamed as London 3 South West.  Remaining as a tier 8 league promotion was to London 2 South West (formerly London 3 South West), while relegation continued to either Hampshire 1 or Surrey 1.

Number of league titles

Farnham (2)
Winchester (2)
Camberley (1)
Chobham (1)
Cobham (1)
Dorking (1)
Gosport & Fareham (1)
London Exiles (1)
Old Alleynians (1)
Old Cranleighans (1)
Old Reigatian (1)
Purley John Fisher (1)
Reeds Weybridge (1)
Richmond (1)
Teddington (1)
Tottonians (1)
Warlingham (1)
Weybridge Vandals (1)

Notes

See also
 English rugby union system
 Rugby union in England

References

8
4
Rugby union in Surrey